"Hit the Road Jack" is a 1960 song popularized by Ray Charles.

Hit the Road Jack may also refer to:

 Hit the Road Jack (album), by Big Youth, 1976
 Hit the Road Jack (TV series), a 2012 British comedy series
 "Hit the Road, Jack" (Civil Wars), a 1993 television episode
 "Hit the Road Jack" (Kickin' It), a 2012 television episode
 "Hit the Road, Jack" (Roseanne), a 1997 television episode
 Hit the Road Jack, an unrealized film project proposed by David Gordon Green